Rabbi Chaim Schneur Zalman Schneersohn of Liadi (1814-1880), was a Hasidic rebbe in the town of Liadi;
He was the first rebbe of the Liadi branch of Chabad.

Rebbe in Liadi 
Rabbi Chaim Schneur Zalman was the son of Rabbi Menachem Mendel Schneersohn (the third rebbe of Chabad-Lubavitch), and became a rebbe in his own right for a number of Chabad Chasidim following his father's death. 

After the death of Rabbi Menachem Mendel Schneersohn (the third rebbe of Chabad-Lubavitch), several of his sons independently assumed the role of rebbe. 
Rabbi Chaim Schneur Zalman assumed the role of rebbe in the Liadi, the same town his great-grandfather, Rabbi Shneur Zalman of Liadi (the first rebbe of Chabad-Lubavitch), was rebbe. Rabbi Chaim Schneur Zalman was succeeded by his son, Rabbi Yitzchak Dovber of Liadi.

See also 
 Chabad offshoot groups

References 

Rebbes of Chabad
Schneersohn family
1814 births
1880 deaths